Lepiota subalba is a species of fungus belonging to the family Agaricaceae.

It is native to Europe.

References

subalba